Hidalgo or Villa Hidalgo is a community located in the Mexican state of Coahuila.  It is the municipal seat of Hidalgo Municipality. According to the INEGI census of 2010, Hidalgo has a population of 1,638 inhabitants.  Its elevation is 150 meters above sea level.

References 

Populated places in Coahuila
Laredo–Nuevo Laredo
Coahuila populated places on the Rio Grande